This is a short timeline of women lawyers. Much more information on the subject can be found at: List of first women lawyers and judges by nationality.

 1847 - Marija Milutinović became the first female lawyer and attorney in Serbia, doing exclusively pro bono work for charity throughout her whole career
 1869 -  Arabella Mansfield became the first female lawyer in the United States when she was admitted to the Iowa bar.
 1870 - Ada Kepley became the first woman to graduate from law school in the United States; she graduated from Chicago University Law School, predecessor to Union College of Law, later known as Northwestern University School of Law.
 1872 - Charlotte E. Ray became the first African-American female lawyer in the United States.
 1872 - Clara Hapgood Nash became the first woman admitted to the bar in New England.
 1873 - Johanna von Evreinov became the first woman to obtain a Doctor of Law (Dr. jur.) degree in Germany on 21 February 1873, after having been admitted as a guest student at Leipzig University.
 1873 - Bradwell v. State of Illinois, 83 U.S. 130 (1873), was a United States Supreme Court case that solidified the narrow reading of the Privileges or Immunities Clause of the Fourteenth Amendment, and determined that the right to practice a profession was not among these privileges. The case is also notable for being an early 14th Amendment challenge to sex discrimination in the United States. In this case the United States Supreme Court held that Illinois constitutionally denied law licenses to women, because the right to practice law was not one of the privileges and immunities guaranteed by the Fourteenth Amendment. The Illinois Supreme Court affirmed.
 1879: A law was enacted allowing qualified female attorneys to practice in any federal court in the United States. 
 1879 - Belva Ann Lockwood became the first woman to argue before the United States Supreme Court.
1897 - Clara Brett Martin became the first female lawyer in Canada and the British Empire.
 1897 - Ethel Benjamin became the first female lawyer in New Zealand and the first to appear as counsel for any case in the British Empire.
 1899 -  The (American) National Association of Women Lawyers, originally called the Women Lawyers' Club, was founded by a group of 18 women lawyers in New York City.
 1905 - Flos Greig became the first female barrister in Australia.
 1911 - Clotilde Luisi became the first female lawyer in Uruguay.
 1912 - In the South African case, Incorporated Law Society v. Wookey, 1912 AD 623,  the Appellate Division found that the word "persons" used in the statute concerning admission of attorneys to the bar included only men, and thus Madeline Wookey could not be a lawyer. This case came about because although a law firm was willing to enroll Wookey as an articled clerk, the Cape Law Society refused to register her articles. Wookey then applied to the Cape Supreme Court, which ordered the Cape Law Society to register her. The Cape Law Society then appealed this to the Appellate Division, claiming that Wookey could not be admitted as a lawyer because she was female. 
 1913 - Natividad Almeda-Lopez became the first female lawyer in the Philippines.
 1917 - Judge  became the first female judge in Soviet Russia. The first female judge in Siberia and the Far East.
 1918 -  Judge Mary Belle Grossman and Mary Florence Lathrop became the first two female lawyers admitted to the American Bar Association.
 1918 - Eva Andén became the first female lawyer admitted to the Swedish Bar Association.
 1920  - Edith Cowan became Australia's first female magistrate.
 1920 - Ella Negruzzi became the first female lawyer in Romania.
 1922 - Ivy Williams became the first woman to be called to the English bar.
 1922 - Women were allowed to become lawyers in Belgium.
 1922 - Helena Normanton became the first female barrister to practice in England.
 1922 -  Florence E. Allen became the first woman elected to a U.S. state supreme court (specifically, the Ohio Supreme Court).
 1922 - Florence King became the first woman to argue a patent case before the U.S. Supreme Court.
 1922 - Auvergne Doherty became the first woman from Western Australia to be admitted to the English bar.
 1923 - Irene Antoinette Geffen (née Newmark) became the first female lawyer in South Africa when she was admitted to the bar in the Transvaal in 1923.
 1923 - Florence King became the first woman to win a case before the U.S. Supreme Court in 1923 (Crown v. Nye).
 1928 - Genevieve Cline won U.S. Senate confirmation on May 25, 1928 as a judge of the United States Customs Court (now known as the Court of International Trade), received her commission on May 26, 1928, and took her oath of office in the Cleveland Federal Building on June 5, 1928, thus becoming the first American woman appointed to the federal bench.
 1929 - Olive H. Rabe became the first woman to argue a free speech case before the U.S. Supreme Court in 1929 (United States v. Schwimmer).
 1937 - Anna Chandy of Travancore (later Kerala), British India became the first woman judge in the Anglo-Saxon world.
 1940 - Ai Kume, Masako Nakata, and Yoshiko Mibuchi became the first three women admitted to the bar in Japan.
 1941 – Frances Moran became the first woman to take silk in the British Isles when she was called to the Irish Inner Bar. 
 1943 - Frances Wright was called to the bar, becoming the first female lawyer in Sierra Leone.
1956 - Elizabeth Evatt became the first woman appointed as a judge to the Family Court of Australia. She would go on to serve as Chief Justice in 1976.
 1965 - Lorna E. Lockwood became the first woman chief justice of any U.S. state (specifically, she was chief justice of Arizona).
 1970 - Doris Brin Walker became the first female president of the (American) National Lawyers Guild.
 1971 - Barring women from practicing law was prohibited in the U.S.
 1976 - Pat O'Shane became the first Indigenous Australian barrister in NSW. She would go on to become a magistrate.
 1981 -  Sandra Day O'Connor became the first woman to serve as a justice of the United States Supreme Court.
 1981 - Arnette Hubbard became the first female president of the (American) National Bar Association.
 1984 - In Hishon v. King & Spaulding (1984) the United States Supreme Court ruled that Title VII of the Civil Rights Act of 1964 bans discrimination by employers in the context of any contractual employer/employee relationship, including but not limited to law partnerships.
1987 - Mary Gaudron became the first woman to serve as a Justice of the High Court of Australia.
 1988 - Sue Gordon was appointed as magistrate to the Perth Children's Court becoming the first Indigenous Australian magistrate in Western Australia.
 1988 - Juanita Kidd Stout was appointed to the Supreme Court of Pennsylvania, thus becoming the first African-American woman to serve on a state's highest court.
 1995 - Roberta Cooper Ramo became the first female president of the American Bar Association.
 2008 -  Roberta Cooper Ramo became the first female president of the American Law Institute.
 2009 - Sonia Sotomayor became the first Hispanic and Latina female to serve as a Justice of the United States Supreme Court. 
 2017 -  Susan Kiefel became the first female Chief Justice of the High Court of Australia.

See also
 List of first women lawyers and judges by nationality
 List of first women lawyers and judges in the United States
 Timeline of women lawyers in the United States
 Women in law

References

Lawyers